The Hungary–Ukraine border is an internationally established boundary between Hungary and Ukraine. Ukraine inherited it from the Soviet Union.

The current border was established after World War II when Zakarpattia Oblast was admitted into Ukraine, which at the time was part of the Soviet Union as the Ukrainian Soviet Socialist Republic. The border stretches for  along the Tisza river valley.

After the admission of Hungary to the European Union, the border security became the responsibility of the union, as well.

Border checkpoints

Road

Rail

See also
 State Border of Ukraine
 Hungary–Ukraine relations
 Zakarpattia Lowland

References

External links
 Кордоні з Словацькою Республікою пункти пропуску через державний кордон України

 
European Union external borders
Borders of Hungary
Borders of Ukraine
International borders